Black Diamond is the debut studio album by American singer Angie Stone. It was released on September 28, 1999, by Arista Records. The album is named after Stone's then-teenaged daughter Diamond Ti'ara.

Track listing

Notes
  signifies an additional producer
  signifies a remixer

Sample credits
 "No More Rain (In This Cloud)" contains excerpts and samples of "Neither One of Us (Wants to Be the First to Say Goodbye)" by Gladys Knight & the Pips.

Personnel
Credits adapted from the liner notes of Black Diamond.

Musicians

 Angie Stone – vocals
 Joe Belmaati – programming, musician
 Rex Rideout – programming, musician
 Chalmers "Spanky" Alford – musician
 D'Angelo – musician
 Iran – musician
 Jonas Krag – musician
 Lenny Kravitz – musician
 Aaron "Freedom" Lyles – musician
 Ali Shaheed Muhammad – musician
 Joe Quinde – musician
 Craig Ross – musician
 Sekou Aiken – background vocals
 Stephanie Bolton – background vocals
 Gerry DeVeaux – background vocals
 Tenita Jordan Dreher – background vocals
 Gemini – background vocals
 Juliet Roberts – background vocals

Technical

 Angie Stone – production ; recording engineering, mix engineering, executive production
 Aaron "Freedom" Lyles – production ; recording engineering, mix engineering
 Ali Shaheed Muhammad – production ; recording engineering
 Russell Elevado – production 
 Rex Rideout – production ; engineering assistance
 Phil Temple – production 
 DJ U-Neek – production 
 Gerry DeVeaux – production ; executive production
 Cutfather & Joe – remix, additional production ; mix engineering
 Aaron Connor – recording engineering
 Tim Donovan – recording engineering, mix engineering
 Tim Hunt – recording engineering
 Eli Lishinsky – recording engineering
 Kevin "K.D." Davis – mix engineering
 Tony Maserati – mix engineering
 Mads Nilsson – mix engineering
 Soul Spin – mix engineering
 Denise Barbarita – engineering assistance
 Erik Fryland – engineering assistance
 Charles McCrorey – engineering assistance
 Jeff Gregory – engineering assistance
 Susanne Savage – production coordination
 Miriam Gonzales – production coordination
 Jo Jones – production coordination
 Lesvia Castro – production coordination
 Coen Antonisse – production coordination
 Herb Powers Jr. – mastering
 Peter Edge – executive production

Artwork

 Margery Greenspan – art direction
 Sheri G. Lee – art direction, design
 Ruven Afanador – photography
 Phil Knott – back cover photography
 Angie Stone – collage construction
 Lori Demsey – collage construction

Charts

Weekly charts

Year-end charts

Certifications

Release history

References

1999 debut albums
Angie Stone albums
Arista Records albums